The Ministry of Water Supply is a ministry of the Government of Maharashtra. It is responsible for water supply and management of water resources in Maharashtra.

The Ministry is headed by a cabinet level minister. Gulab Raghunath Patil is currently Minister of Water Supply Government of Maharashtra.

Head office

List of Cabinet Ministers

List of Ministers of State

List of Principal Secretary

Maharashtra Jeevan Pradhikaran
Maharashtra Water Supply and Sewerage Board (MWSSB) came into existence in 1976 as per MWSSB Act 1976. It was renamed as Maharashtra Jeevan Pradhikaran (MJP) in 1997. MJP is responsible for providing water supply scheme to each and every town of Maharashtra excluding Mumbai.

Maharashtra Environmental Engineering Training and Research Academy (MEETRA)
Nashik Research and Training Centre (NRTC) was renamed as Maharashtra Environmental Engineering Training and Research Academy (MEETRA). Institute was established in 1984 with the help of World Bank. MEETRA is an autonomous institute of Maharashtra Jeevan Pradhikaran.
Board of Governance looks after MEETRA. Composition of Board : 
Principal Secretary, Water Supply and Sanitation Department (WSSD), GoM and 
Executive Council headed by Member Secretary, Maharashtra Jeevan Pradhikaran (MJP)
Management staff under Director of Administration
Superintending Engineer

Groundwater Surveys and Development Agency(GSDA)
GSDA was established in 1972 as a result of agreement between International Development Association and Government of Maharashtra.

References

External links

Government ministries of Maharashtra
Water supply and sanitation in India
Maharashtra